Is This Thing Cursed? is the ninth studio album by American punk rock band Alkaline Trio, released on August 31, 2018 on Epitaph Records. Produced and mixed by Cameron Webb, the album was announced alongside the release of the lead single, "Blackbird".

It is their first release since 2013's My Shame Is True, with its five-year gap being the longest between two studio albums to date.

Writing and composition
Vocalist and bassist Dan Andriano compared the recording process to that of the band's early days, "the songwriting process is almost like what it was back in the day. We would just kind of write a song, be excited about it, then move on. We wrote in that spirit in the studio. I really feel like we made a record that the old school fans are going to dig.” The band also compared Is This Thing Cursed? to their second album, Maybe I'll Catch Fire. 

Themes and topics covered on the album include depression, the 2016 presidential election, the Access Hollywood tape, the band's hometown of Chicago, and the Fyre Festival that vocalist and guitarist Matt Skiba was set to headline with Blink-182, but cancelled.

Reception

The album has received generally positive reviews. AllMusic wrote "Recapturing the spirit of earlier recordings, Chicago punk stalwarts Alkaline Trio polish those rough edges of youthful messiness and hit an effortless stride with their ninth album. At its boisterous best, Cursed soars with the trademark harmonies of Matt Skiba and Dan Andriano, popping with an energy that recalls past peaks like 2000's Maybe I'll Catch Fire and 2001's From Here to Infirmary." Kerrang! gave the band a glowing review writing "Despite having become effectively a part-time concern and thus an outfit whose status remains steadfastly cult, at the very least Alkaline Trio can take a (grim) pride in having returned and reclaimed the title of Punk Rock Connoisseurs’ Band Of Choice with criminal ease here. As ever, on Is This Thing Cursed?, their music comes in any colour you like, so long as it’s black."

Track listing
Taken from Apple Music.

Personnel
Alkaline Trio
 Matt Skiba – guitar, vocals
 Dan Andriano – bass, vocals
 Derek Grant – drums, vocals

Production
 Cameron Webb – production, mixing

Charts

References

2018 albums
Alkaline Trio albums
Epitaph Records albums